The Citronaut was the first mascot of Florida Technological University (FTU), which later became the University of Central Florida (UCF). The mascot appeared on the first student handbook in 1968–1969. After one year, students petitioned the university's student government to establish a new mascot for the university. In 1970, students approved "Knights of the Pegasus" as the second official university mascot, which remains to this day (albeit after being simplified to "Knights").

History
The Citronaut was designed by Norman Van Meter, the brother-in-law of FTU's then-president Charles N. Millican in an attempt to combine the two major themes of Central Florida at the time: the citrus industry, and the space program. Florida produces approximately 100 million boxes of citrus annually, and FTU was founded in 1963 to provide personnel to support NASA at the Kennedy Space Center and Cape Canaveral Air Force Station. As the academic scope of the university broadened, it was renamed to the University of Central Florida in 1978.

Modern appearances

Since 2014, the Citronaut has experienced a renaissance in university publications, athletics programing, and merchandise.

 May 10, 2014 – UCF Baseball proclaimed Citronaut Day
 September 19, 2015 – UCF Men's Soccer played in fauxback Citronaut uniforms
 Spring 2016 – Knights in Space
 November 2018 – Citronaut appears on uniforms of the UCF football team against Temple in the themed Space Game.
 November 2019 – Citronaut appears on uniforms of the UCF football team against Houston Cougars in the themed Space Game that took off at noon on Saturday, November 2, 2019.
 April 2022 - Citronaut appears on UCF softball uniforms in a game against Virginia Tech.

References

University of Central Florida
Mascots introduced in 1968